The Demonwar Saga is a series of fantasy novels by American writer  Raymond E. Feist.

Concept
In the fantasy novels of Feist, a "riftwar" is war between two worlds that are connected by some sort of dimensionless gap (a "rift"). In Feist's fictional universe several riftwars occur. The first riftwar, between Midkemia and Kelewan, takes place in the trilogy The Riftwar Saga. Feist has confirmed that there will be five riftwars in total. The Demonwar will be followed by the Chaoswar.

Works in the series

Rides a Dread Legion (2009)

At the Gates of Darkness (2010)

Notes

Works by Raymond E. Feist
Fantasy novel series
HarperCollins books